The World Indigenous Television Broadcasters Network (WITBN) is a confederation of indigenous broadcasting organisations from countries serving indigenous and minority language populations. Members are radio and television companies, most of which are government-owned public service broadcasters or privately owned stations with public missions.

Members
: NITV
: 
APTN
Isuma
: Yle Sámi Radio
: TG4
:
Te Reo
Whakaata Māori
: NRK Sápmi
: Paraguay TV
:
SR Sápmi
SVT Sápmi
:
PTS
Hakka TV
TITV
: Thai PBS
:
BBC Alba
S4C
:
FNX
'Ōiwi TV
Pacific Islanders in Communications (PIC)

References

External links
 WITBN Website

Television organizations
Indigenous television
Organizations established in 2008